Marco Antonio Tomati may refer to:
Marco Antonio Tomati (bishop of Asti) (???–1693), Italian Roman Catholic bishop 
Marco Antonio Tomati (bishop of Bitetto) (1591–1665), Italian Roman Catholic bishop